Chronique d'un cheval fou  is a 1999 Canadian short drama film directed by Michel Juliani, produced by Raymond Gravelle, and starring , Nathalie Breuer, and Jean-François Pichette, with a score by , about a couple whose strained relationship is put to the test when one of them interviews the other live on the radio.

Synopsis
A radio host interviews her author husband live on the air. Over the course of their professional dialogue, the couple's relationship goes through a subtle deterioration. By the end of the allotted half hour, it's over.

Cast
Nathalie Breuer

Jean-François Pichette

This was Jean-François Pichette's first film since Le lac de la Lune (1994) directed by Michel Jetté.

Production

Filming
Principal photography for Chronique d'un cheval fou took place in Montréal the week of 16 October 1998.

Music
In 1999, director Michel Juliani approached Martine Carrière to be the solo vocalist accompanying the piano played by composer .

Release and reception
Chronique d'un cheval fou had its world premiere at the 18th Abitibi-Témiscamingue International Film Festival, in Rouyn-Noranda on 2 November 1999, presented by Juliani and Pichette.

The film achieved a wider theatrical release in 2001 as the short accompanying Abdelkrim Bahloul's La Nuit du destin.

Accolade
The short was nominated for Best Live Action Short Drama at the 20th Genie Awards (2000) but lost to Moving Day.

References

External links
Chronique d'un cheval fou on IMDb

Canadian drama short films
Quebec films
French-language Canadian films
1990s Canadian films